The Chistochina Trading Post was a historic roadhouse at mile marker 32 of the Tok Cutoff in the Valdez-Cordova Census Area of southeastern Alaska. It consisted of a connected series of log structures, whose main block is two stories high.  The main block, which housed traveler accommodations, is connected to a larger single-story structure, which houses the dining room and bar area.  A trading post is believed to have been standing here since as early as 1917; the main lodge was built in 1931.

The roadhouse was listed on the National Register of Historic Places in 1997. It was destroyed by fire in 1999.

See also
National Register of Historic Places listings in Copper River Census Area, Alaska

References

Buildings and structures completed in 1931
Buildings and structures demolished in 1999
Buildings and structures on the National Register of Historic Places in Copper River Census Area, Alaska
Commercial buildings on the National Register of Historic Places in Alaska
Demolished buildings and structures in Alaska
Retail buildings in Alaska